Aeolidiidae, a family of aeolid nudibranchs, are a family of sea slugs, shell-less marine gastropod molluscs.

Most, or perhaps all, members of this family feed on sea anemones and have a distinctive single row of comb-shaped serrated radular teeth.

Genera 
Genera within the Aeolidiidae include:
 Aeolidia Cuvier, 1798
 Aeolidiella Bergh, 1867
 Anteaeolidiella M. C. Miller, 2001
 Baeolidia Bergh, 1888
 Berghia Trinchese, 1877
 Bulbaeolidia Carmona, Pola, Gosliner & Cervera, 2013
 Burnaia M. C. Miller, 2001
 Cerberilla Bergh, 1873: unrevised taxonomic status 
 Limenandra Haefelfinger & Stamm, 1958
 Spurilla Bergh, 1864
Genera brought into synonymy:
 Aeolidina Pruvot-Fol, 1951: synonym of Aeolidiella Bergh, 1867
 Aeolidiopsis Pruvot-Fol, 1956: synonym of Baeolidia Bergh, 1888
 Aeolis Menke, 1844: synonym of Aeolidia Cuvier, 1798
 Eolida synonym of Aeolidia Cuvier, 1798
 Eolidia Cuvier, 1816: synonym of Aeolidia Cuvier, 1798
 Eolidina Quatrefages, 1843: synonym of Aeolidiella Bergh, 1867
 Eolis Cuvier, 1805: synonym of Aeolidia Cuvier, 1798
 Fenrisia Bergh, 1888: synonym of Cerberilla Bergh, 1873
 Millereolidia Ortea, Caballer & Espinosa, 2004: synonym of Berghia Trinchese, 1877
 Milleria Ortea, Caballer & Espinosa, 2003: synonym of Millereolidia Ortea, Caballer & Espinosa, 2004: synonym of Berghia Trinchese, 1877
 Protaeolidia Baba, 1955: synonym of Protaeolidiella Baba, 1955, family Pleurolidiidae

References

 Gosliner, T.M. 1987. Nudibranchs of Southern Africa

External links
 Aeolidiidae in Malacolog
 Aeolidiidae All related articles in Sea Slug Forum